Omar Alejandro Avilán Mendoza (born 29 April 1977) is a Mexican former footballer who played as a midfielder.

Club career
Born in Guadalajara, Jalisco, Avilán made his professional debut with Club Atlas in February 1995. He joined Toros Neza for one year in 1998, and then moved to C.F. Monterrey. He would finish his career with stints at Puebla F.C. and Querétaro F.C.

International career
Avilán made one appearance for the Mexico national football team, entering as a second-half substitute a friendly against Ecuador on 5 February 1997.

References

External links

1977 births
Living people
Footballers from Guadalajara, Jalisco
Association football midfielders
Mexican footballers
Mexico under-20 international footballers
Mexico international footballers
Atlas F.C. footballers
Toros Neza footballers
C.F. Monterrey players
Club Puebla players
Querétaro F.C. footballers
Liga MX players